The Kuala Kubu Bharu railway station is a Malaysian train station stationed at the northern side of and named after the town of Kuala Kubu Bharu, Selangor. The station provides both Komuter and ETS services. The station was opened on January 5, 2008. The station replaced the Kuala Kubu Road railway station approximately 2.5 km northwest.

It was the fourth stop in the Rawang-Tanjung Malim shuttle service (formerly known as the Rawang-Kuala Kubu Bharu shuttle service) until direct services to Port Klang were introduced in 2016.

The station, as are all the other stations along the shuttle route (except the Tanjung Malim Komuter station), is situated along two railways with two platforms like most station halts along KTM Komuter lines, but contains facilities normally reserved for medium-to-large stations along three or more lines. In addition to ticketing facilities and basic amenities, the station contains spaces for administrative occupants, as well as a "kiosk" and an additional footbridge (fused with a footbridge exclusively for Komuter users) for pedestrians that simply intend to cross the railway lines. The station also includes low-tech support for disabled passengers. The station exits northeast into a branch road that leads east into the town center of Kuala Kubu Bharu.

The Kuala Kubu Bharu station's two side platforms are designated as Platform 1 (adjoining the main station building at the east, intended for southbound trains) and Platform 2 (at the west, intended for northbound trains).

References

External links
 Kuala Kubu Bharu KTM Railway Station

Rawang-Seremban Line
Railway stations in Selangor
Rapid transit stations in Selangor